Badar Juma Subait Al-Alawi (born 6 December 1981), commonly known as Badar Juma, is an Omani former footballer who last played as a goalkeeper for Dhofar S.C.S.C. in the Oman Elite League.

International career
Badar was selected for the national team for the first time in 2000. He has made appearances in the 2002 FIFA World Cup qualification and in the 2010 FIFA World Cup qualification and has represented the national team in 2004 Gulf Cup of Nations, the 2004 AFC Asian Cup, the 2007 AFC Asian Cup qualification, the 2007 Gulf Cup of Nations, the 2007 AFC Asian Cup, the 2009 Gulf Cup of Nations, the 2006 FIFA World Cup qualification and the 2014 FIFA World Cup qualification.

Although he has not officially retired from the national team, and being still available for international duty, he has not frequently featured for the national team. The last time he represented the team was in a 2014 FIFA World Cup qualification match against Thailand.

Badar also played at 1997 FIFA U-17 World Championship in Egypt with fellow Dhofar S.C.S.C. teammate, Hashim Saleh.

References

External links
 
 
 
 
 

1981 births
Living people
Omani footballers
Oman international footballers
Association football goalkeepers
2004 AFC Asian Cup players
Dhofar Club players
Footballers at the 2002 Asian Games
Asian Games competitors for Oman